The Robb Report is an American, English-language, luxury-lifestyle magazine featuring products, including automobiles, aviation, boating, real estate and watches. Founded in 1976, it is currently owned by Penske Media Corporation. It also distributes Muse by Robb Report, a luxury magazine targeting female readers.

History
The Robb Report was founded in 1976 by Robert L "Rusty" White. Originally titled Twentieth Century Confederates, it began as a newsletter to sell his personal collection of Civil War memorabilia and Rolls-Royce automobiles. White distributed his newsletter to members of the Rolls-Royce Owners Club as mimeographed loose-leaf pages, and he provided a suede three-ring binder to paying subscribers. The publication matured into an advertorial, one of the first of its kind, catering to affluent clientele. The blend of advertising and editorial was broadcast to high-end, affluent consumers via advertisements in Architectural Digest.

In 2002, the "Robb Report" brand was sold for US$150 million to CurtCo Media, after which CurtCo was renamed Curtco Robb Media LLC.
The Robb Report has partnered with Bespoke Collection to develop auction items for Auction Napa Valley. In 2014, Robb Report was acquired by Rockbridge, the private equity firm of Dan Gilbert, for $60 million. 
In 2017, Rockbridge created a joint venture for the Robb Report with Penske Media Corporation. 

In April 2018, Robb Report launched Muse by Robb Report targeting female readership. The company publishes international versions of its magazine. In 2016, the number of international editions of Robb Report was sixteen.

See also
Departures
Worth

References

External links
 Robb Report website 

Lifestyle magazines published in the United States
Monthly magazines published in the United States
Magazines established in 1976
Magazines published in California
Penske Media Corporation
Rock Ventures
Women's magazines published in the United States
Newsletters